Giorgos Gavriilidis (Greek: Γιώργος Γαβριηλίδης; 1908 – 23 July 1982) was a Greek actor.

He was the husband of Marika Krevata (1910 - 14 September 1994). He was marked out from the theatre and played roles in many comedies in the cinema and later on television.

He died on 23 July 1982 from pneumonic edema and was buried at the Third Cemetery in Nikaia north of Piraeus and west of Athens.

Filmography

External links

1906 births
1982 deaths
Greek male film actors
Deaths from pulmonary edema
20th-century Greek male actors
Actors from Piraeus